The 2012–13 Liga de Fútbol Profesional Boliviano season was the 36th season of LFPB.

Teams
The number of teams for 2012 remains the same. Real Mamoré finished last in the 2011 relegation table and was relegated to the Liga Nacional B for the first time since the club was founded. They were replaced by the 2011–12 Liga Nacional B champion Petrolero.

Torneo Apertura

Standings

Results

Copa Libertadores/Copa Sudamericana playoff
A playoff was contested between the third-placed teams of the 2011/12 Clausura (Oriente Petrolero) and the 2012/13 Apertura (Bolívar). The winner qualified for the 2013 Copa Libertadores First Stage, while the loser qualified for the 2013 Copa Sudamericana First Stage.

Torneo Clausura

Standings

Results

Top goalscorers

Updated as of games played on May 6, 2013.Source:

Poker Goals

Relegation

Source:

Relegation/promotion playoff

References

External links
 Official website of the LFPB 
 Official regulations 

2012
2013 in South American football leagues
2012 in South American football leagues
1

zh:2011年至2012年玻利维亚足球甲级联赛